Amyra Dastur (born 7 May 1992) is an Indian actress who prominently works in Hindi, Telugu, and Tamil films.

Early life and career
Dastur is Parsi and she speaks English and Gujarati at home. She holds a bachelor's degree in commerce from Mumbai's HR College.

Dastur started her career as a model in commercials. Dastur made her Hindi cinema-acting debut in Manish Tiwary's romantic drama Issaq, alongside Prateik Babbar.

Amyra in her first international project, Kung Fu Yoga acted alongside Jackie Chan which released in India on 3 February 2017.

Amyra Dastur was also seen in director Akshat Verma's next, titled Kaalakaandi, starring Saif Ali Khan. Amyra shot for a song in the film which is an upbeat dance number and has some fun lyrics. The track has been choreographed by Adil Malik of Kar Gayi Chul fame.

She debuted in Telugu cinema with Mahesh Babu's sister's first directorial venture, Manasuku Nachindi. Again in 2018, Amyra had her second Telugu release with Rajugadu opposite Raj Tarun.

Filmography

Films

Television

References

External links

 

Living people
1993 births
Actresses from Mumbai
Parsi people
Parsi people from Mumbai
Indian film actresses
Indian television actresses
Actresses in Hindi cinema
Actresses in Tamil cinema
Actresses in Telugu cinema
Actresses in Hindi television
21st-century Indian actresses